Bibasilaris erythea is a species of snout moth. It was described by Herbert Druce in 1900. It is found in Colombia and Brazil.

References

Moths described in 1900
Epipaschiinae